The Spain women's national beach handball team is the national team of Spain. It is governed by the Royal Spanish Handball Federation and takes part in international beach handball competitions.

World Championships results
2008 – 2nd place
2010 – 9th place
2014 – 5th place
2016 – 1st place
2018 – 4th place
2022 – Qualified

References

External links
Official website
IHF profile

Women's national beach handball teams
Beach handball